Mnesilochus is a genus of stick insects in the subfamily Lonchodinae.  Species have a known distribution in: Borneo, Philippines, Sumatra.

Species
The Phasmida Species File lists:
 Mnesilochus bushelli (Bragg, 2005)
 Mnesilochus capreolus Stål, 1877
 Mnesilochus haedulus Stål, 1877
 Mnesilochus jenswilhelmjanzeni (Zompro, 2007)
 Mnesilochus mindanaense (Brunner von Wattenwyl, 1907)
 Mnesilochus palawanicus (Carl, 1913)
 Mnesilochus portentosus (Brunner von Wattenwyl, 1907)
 Mnesilochus rusticus (Brunner von Wattenwyl, 1907)
 Mnesilochus verrucosus (Haan, 1842)

References

Phasmatodea genera
Lonchodidae